Idd Mohamed is a Somali diplomat. As of August 2012, he served as Somalia's Ambassador extraordinary and deputy permanent representative to the United Nations. He also founded the Somalia Stock Exchange Investment Corporation (SSE) the same year.

References

Living people
Somalian diplomats
Year of birth missing (living people)
Place of birth missing (living people)